The Asian Championship is the largest Brazilian Jiu-Jitsu tournament held in Asia by the International Brazilian Jiu-Jitsu Federation.

History
The Asian Jiu-Jitsu Championship has been held since 2006 with the first tournament taking place in Tokyo, Japan. In 2008, the championship moved to Bangkok, Thailand, its 2010 third edition was held in Amman, Jordan.  The fourth edition was held on the 15th & 16 July 2012 in Doha, Qatar.  As of 2013 forwards the championship is hosted annually in Tokyo Japan. For the 2017/2018 season it carried a weighting of 3 in the IBJJF tournament list.

Asian Champions in Men's Brazilian Jiu Jitsu by Year and Weight

Asian Champions in Women's Brazilian Jiu Jitsu by Year and Weight

See also 
 IBJJF
 Brazilian Jiu-Jitsu weight classes
 World IBJJF Jiu-Jitsu Championship
 World IBJJF Jiu-Jitsu No-Gi Championship
 European IBJJF Jiu-Jitsu Championship
 European IBJJF Jiu-Jitsu No-Gi Championship
 Pan IBJJF Jiu-Jitsu Championship
 Pan IBJJF Jiu-Jitsu No-Gi Championship
 Brazilian National Jiu-Jitsu Championship
 Brazilian Nationals Jiu-Jitsu No-Gi Championship

References

External links 
International Brazilian Jiu-Jitsu Federation

Asian international sports competitions
Brazilian jiu-jitsu competitions